The Ministry of Agriculture and Rural Affairs of the People's Republic of China is the cabinet-level executive department of the State Council which is responsible for agriculture and rural affairs in the country. The ministry is headquartered in Beijing. It was formed on 19 March 2018 as the agency superseding the former Ministry of Agriculture. Some of its additional responsibilities come from the agricultural investment projects of the National Development and Reform Commission, the Ministry of Finance, the Ministry of Land and Resources, and the Ministry of Water Resources.

History
On March 19, 2018, the Government of the People's Republic of China announced that the Ministry of Agriculture and Rural Affairs has been created at the first session of the 13th National People's Congress. That same day, Han Changfu was elected Minister of Agriculture and Rural Affairs.

List of ministers

References 

Agriculture
China
China
Ministries established in 2018
2018 establishments in China
Agricultural organizations based in China